Világgazdaság (World Economy in English) is a Hungarian business online newspaper. It operates as part of Mediaworks Hungary Zrt. The newspaper was traditionally issued on every Budapest Stock Exchange trading day, until it became an online-only publication in 2022.

History and profile
Világgazdaság was founded in 1969. It is headquartered in Budapest.

The daily is called "the green newspaper" since it is published on green paper. During the communist era in Hungary it was the first newspaper which was allowed direct access to Western news agencies. Its sister publication is Heti, a weekly founded in 1979.

The last printed edition of Világgazdaság was published on 30 June 2022, leaving only the online edition.

References

External links
Official website 

1969 establishments in Hungary
Publications established in 1969
Newspapers published in Budapest
Hungarian-language newspapers
Business newspapers